Shahid Wasif (born 15 May 1997) is a Hong Kong cricketer. He is a right-handed batsman and right-arm off break bowler. He made his Twenty20 International (T20I) debut against Ireland on 5 September 2016. He made his One Day International (ODI) debut against Scotland on 8 September 2016.

In December 2018, he was named in Hong Kong's team for the 2018 ACC Emerging Teams Asia Cup. In April 2019, he was named in Hong Kong's squad for the 2019 ICC World Cricket League Division Two tournament in Namibia. In September 2019, he was named in Hong Kong's squad for the 2019 ICC T20 World Cup Qualifier tournament in the United Arab Emirates. In November 2019, he was named in Hong Kong's squad for the 2019 ACC Emerging Teams Asia Cup in Bangladesh. Later the same month, he was named in Hong Kong's squad for the Cricket World Cup Challenge League B tournament in Oman.

References

External links
 

1997 births
Living people
Hong Kong cricketers
Hong Kong One Day International cricketers
Hong Kong Twenty20 International cricketers
Place of birth missing (living people)
Pakistani emigrants to Hong Kong
Wicket-keepers